Pierre Morency,  (born 8 May 1942) is a French Canadian writer, poet and playwright.

Life
Born in Lauzon, Quebec, he received a Bachelor of Arts degree from the Collège de Lévis in 1963 and a teaching diploma from the Université Laval in 1966.

Awards
In 2002, Morency was made an officer of the Order of Canada and "is considered one of the most important poets of his generation, drawing his inspiration from the various expressions of life". In 2005, he was made a knight of the National Order of Quebec. In 2000, he was awarded the Quebec government's Prix Athanase-David.

Selected bibliography
 L'Oeil américain, winner of the 1989 Governor General's Awards
 Lumière des oiseaux, winner of the 1992 Governor General's Awards
 La Vie entière — Histoires naturelles du Nouveau Monde, winner of the 1997 Governor General's Awards

References

External links
 . A Guide to the Literary Fonds
Pierre Morency website. 
 Fonds Pierre Morency, Bibliothèque et Archives nationales du Québec
 Fonds Pierre Morency (R11780) at Library and Archives Canada

1942 births
Living people
20th-century Canadian poets
Canadian male poets
Knights of the National Order of Quebec
Officers of the Order of Canada
Writers from Quebec
Université Laval alumni
Canadian poets in French
Prix Alain-Grandbois
Prix Athanase-David winners
20th-century Canadian male writers